John-David William "J.D." Jackson (born February 27, 1969) is a Canadian-French former professional basketball player and coach. He most recently served as head coach of the French team BCM Gravelines-Dunkerque.

Playing career 
Born in Burnaby, British Columbia, and grew up in Vernon, British Columbia, Jackson spent his college career at the University of British Columbia. He is one of the best players ever to wear a UBC uniform and was inducted into the UBC Sports Hall of Fame in 1998. He left UBC in 1992 as the school's leader in career points (3,585), career three-pointers (252), career free throws made (791) among other records. He received CIAU National Player of the Year honors in 1991 and 1992 and is a four-time CIAU All-Canadian. He represented the Canadian junior national team at the 1987 World Championships and Canada's men's national team at the 1990 and 1994 World Championships.

After a stint with the Halifax Wildjammers (WBL), he spent his professional career almost entirely in France, playing two years at Poissy-Chatou, one year at Prisse, two years at Antibes and seven at Le Mans Sarthe Basket. He won the French national championship and the La Semaine des As competition with Le Mans in 2006 and the French Cup in 2004. Jackson retired upon the conclusion of the 2005–06 season. He had his jersey number 14 retired at Le Mans.

Coaching career 
Jackson served as head coach of Le Mans Sarthe Basket from 2008 to 2014. Under his guidance, the club claimed the French Cup in 2009 and the La Semaine des As (later Leaders Cup) competition in 2009 and 2014. After parting ways with Le Mans following the 2013–14 season, he took over head-coaching duties at fellow French LNB ProA side ASVEL Villeurbanne in December 2014. In his first full season (2015–16), he guided ASVEL to the French championship. In the 2016–17 season, Jackson led the team to a semi-final appearance. He was sacked on January 15, 2018, because results did not match up to the club's expectations. ASVEL was eighth in the ProA standings at the time of the sacking with a record of eight wins and eight defeats. Jackson served as an assistant coach for Canada's men's national team at the 2021 FIBA Americas qualification tournament. In early May 2021, he accepted the head-coaching role at BCM Gravelines-Dunkerque, returning to coaching after an absence of almost three and a half years. Jackson was sacked on November 24, 2022 with his Gravelines-Dunkerque team 14th of 18 teams in the French league after six defeats in nine games.

References

External links 
 Profile at eurobasket.com
 Profile at asvelbasket.com

1969 births
Living people
ASVEL Basket coaches
Basketball people from British Columbia
Canadian basketball coaches
Canadian expatriate basketball people in France
Canadian men's basketball players
1990 FIBA World Championship players
French basketball coaches
Le Mans Sarthe Basket coaches
Le Mans Sarthe Basket players
Sportspeople from Burnaby
UBC Thunderbirds basketball players
1994 FIBA World Championship players